Turbonilla aequalis is a species of sea snail, a marine gastropod mollusk in the family Pyramidellidae, the pyrams and their allies.

Description
The shell grows to a length of 5 mm.

Distribution
This species occurs in the following locations:
 Northwest Atlantic at depths between 11 mm and 15 m.

Notes
Additional information regarding this species:
 Distribution: southern Massachusetts

References

 Verrill, A. E. 1873. Report on the invertebrate animals of Vineyard Sound and the adjacent waters, with an account of the physical characters of the region. United States Commission of Fish and Fisheries, Report, 1871 and 1872: 295-778, pls. 1-18.

External links
 To Biodiversity Heritage Library (2 publications)
 To Encyclopedia of Life
 To USNM Invertebrate Zoology Mollusca Collection
 To ITIS
 To World Register of Marine Species

aequalis
Gastropods described in 1826